Paul Cupido (born 1972) is a Dutch fine art photographer. His work revolves around the Japanese principle of mu. Cupido was born and grew up on the Dutch island of Terschelling.

Publications

Books by Cupido
Searching for Mu. Netherlands: self-published, 2017. . With some text by Taco Hidde Bakker. Edition of 200 copies. Artist book.
Continuum. Zurich: Bildhalle, 2019. . Edition of 300 copies. Artist book.
Ephémère. 2019. . Edition of 800 copies. A retrospective.
Amazônia. Amsterdam: Alauda, 2019. . With an essay by Hugo Fernando Salinas Fortes junior. Edition of 750 copies.
Mukayu. (M)éditions; Ibasho Gallery, 2020. With an introduction by Taco Hidde Bakker. Edition of 500 copies.
4 a.m. Netherlands: self-published, 2021. Edition of 500 copies. Artist book.

Books with contributions by Cupido
New Dutch Photography Talent 2018. Amsterdam: Gup, 2017. .

References

External links

21st-century Dutch photographers
Fine art photographers
People from Terschelling
Living people
1972 births